The Girnara Brahmin are a Hindu  caste found in the state of Gujarat in India. They mainly serve as priests at Vaishnav temples. They are of equal status with Sachora Brahmins.

See also

 Sompura Brahmin

References

Brahmin communities of Gujarat